Ronald Mukiibi (born 16 September 1991) is a Swedish-born Ugandan professional footballer who plays as a defender for Degerfors. He represents the Uganda national football team internationally and holds a Swedish passport.

Club career
His first Allsvenskan club was BK Häcken. He later spent several years in upstarts Östersunds FK. In the summer of 2021 he was released, only to return in September the same year after failing to find another club. After the 2021 season he was released again.

On 31 January 2022, Mukiibi signed a two-year contract with Degerfors.

International career
Mukiibi was called up to the Uganda national football team for the 2017 Africa Cup of Nations, but declined the callup.

However, he accepted a call-up in 2019 when he was called up again for the 2019 Africa Cup of Nations preliminary squad, subsequently being named in the final 23-man squad on 11 June. He made his debut in a 1–0 win over Côte d'Ivoire on 15 June 2019.

Career statistics

International

References

External links

1991 births
Living people
Footballers from Gothenburg
Ugandan footballers
Uganda international footballers
Swedish footballers
Swedish people of Ugandan descent
Association football defenders
Qviding FIF players
Gunnilse IS players
BK Häcken players
Östersunds FK players
Degerfors IF players
Ettan Fotboll players
Superettan players
Allsvenskan players
2019 Africa Cup of Nations players